Willis "Red" Applegate (November 4, 1921 – August 1, 1965) was a United States boxer and Negro league baseball player.

Early life 

In 1942 at the age of 20, Applegate served in the 92nd Infantry Division in the Mediterranean Theater of Operations during World War II.  He was discharged in 1945.

Boxing 

His professional boxing career began in 1946 with 4 consecutive wins, 2 by knockout (both in the first round), but he was stopped by Austin Johnson.  He won his next fight, and lost the next three.  He fought several more fights afterwards.  In April 1951, he fought legendary boxer Rocky Marciano for 10 rounds, only to lose by decision. Overall, he compiled a record of 11-16-2 (4 KO).  His boxing career ended in 1951 after suffering a detached retina.

Negro league baseball 

In 1947, he briefly pitched for the Newark Eagles of the Negro National League.

References

External links
 and Baseball-Reference Black Baseball Stats and  Seamheads 
 

1921 births
1965 deaths
Boxers from Newark, New Jersey
Heavyweight boxers
Newark Eagles players
American male boxers
Baseball players from New Jersey
United States Army personnel of World War II
African Americans in World War II
African-American United States Army personnel
20th-century African-American sportspeople